Estey Hall, also known as the Allman Building, is a historic building in Philadelphia, Pennsylvania.

Estey Hall is a seven-story, commercial building, designed by architects Baker and Dallet, erected by Herbert D. Allman in 1910–11. It was the site from 1911 to 1924 of the Estey Piano Company.

It was listed on the National Register of Historic Places in 1983.

References

Further reading

External links
 Listing at Philadelphia Buildings and Architects
 Magazine article with original floor plans (1904)

Commercial buildings on the National Register of Historic Places in Philadelphia
Commercial buildings completed in 1911
Rittenhouse Square, Philadelphia
1911 establishments in Pennsylvania